Plays the Devil's Music is the debut studio album by Australian noise rock band Lubricated Goat, released in July 1987 by Black Eye Records.

Track listing

Personnel
Adapted from the Plays the Devil's Music liner notes.
Lubricated Goat
Martin Bland – drums (B1-B4), backing vocals (B1-B4), production (B1-B4)
Brett Ford – drums (A1-A5), backing vocals (A1-A5)
Pete Hartley – bass guitar (A1-A5), guitar feedback (A1-A5), backing vocals (A1-A5)
Stu Spasm – lead vocals, guitar, bass guitar, synthesizer, production

Release history

References

External links 
 

1987 albums
Lubricated Goat albums
Amphetamine Reptile Records albums